Joseph-Alfred Dion (21 March 1897 – 30 November 1957) was an independent then Liberal party member of the House of Commons of Canada. He was born in Île-Verte, Quebec and became a lawyer by career.

Dion was educated at Ste-Anne-de-la-Pocatière, and at Université Laval where he received his LLB degree.

He was first elected to Parliament at the Lake St-John—Roberval riding as an Independent Liberal candidate in the 1945 general election. He and several other Quebec Liberals had broken with their party the year before during the Conscription Crisis of 1944, quitting the party in order to oppose the government's decision to deploy National Resources Mobilization Act conscripts overseas. Previously, conscripts had only been used for "home defence" and kept within Canada. He subsequently rejoined the party and, after serving his first term in the House of Commons, ridings were realigned and Dion became a candidate in the new Roberval riding where he won in the 1949 federal election as an official Liberal party candidate.

From 1949 to 1952, he was the House of Commons' Deputy Speaker. On 8 April 1952, Dion resigned his Parliamentary seat when he was appointed a puisne judge of the Superior Court of Quebec.

References

External links
 

1897 births
1957 deaths
Independent Liberal MPs in Canada
Liberal Party of Canada MPs
Members of the House of Commons of Canada from Quebec
Lawyers in Quebec
Université Laval alumni